RADION International is a Singapore-registered Christian humanitarian relief and development non-government organisation (NGO). RADION's core work primarily focuses on long-term assistance to underprivileged and marginalized communities in Asia. RADION International, headquartered in Chiang Mai, Thailand, serves communities in critical need across northern Thailand and The Philippines. As of 2018, RADION has launched its signature child protection and developments programs to serve communities in Laos in partnership with the Ministry Of Labour and Social Welfare (MLSW), Laos PDR. RADION has also been involved in short-term projects to disaster areas, like in The Philippines during Haiyan typhoon.

RADION programs cover child rescue and protection, community development, disaster recovery, with the bulk of its work dedicated to aiding critically needy children and their families. Most of its donors are Singaporeans.

History

Founding 
RADION International was founded in 2007, starting as three-man team based in Chiang Mai. The founders of RADION had learned of the plight of some 8,900 Hmong from previous humanitarian missions and were inspired to provide aid to the critically needy among the refugees. The Hmong, who had sought asylum in Northern Thailand following the events of the regional conflicts, had fallen into extreme poverty, with children becoming a particular high-risk group.

The organization has since designed most of its programs to address the needs of these children and their families, which founders say necessitate long-term efforts of some "20-to-40 years".

In 2018, RADION claims to have reached as many as 7,000 direct beneficiaries in 2018 alone.

RADION International's Chairman is Dr Joel Yang, and is led by Executive Director Eugene Wee, who is also one of the founders.

Initiatives 
RADION runs a number of both long-term and short-term programs in Asia, with most of its efforts targeting the Hmong refugees in Northern Thailand. The strategic focus of the programs has shifted over the years, in response to the evolving needs of the beneficiaries on the ground.

STREETKIDS! Rehabilitation Shelter (STK) 
An intervention and rehabilitation program for children from high-risk backgrounds (i.e. poverty, substance abuse, gangs, physical abuse/neglect). The program provides education, nutrition, healthcare, emotional support and character development for these children.

Building on the success of the StreetKIDS, a second shelter was set up in Chiangmai in 2011 to accommodate the influx and education needs for the older children. In 2012, The StreetKIDS programme started to receive more high-risk and abuse cases, prompting the management to set up a rescue arm to provide direct assistance to children who were at risk of being trafficked as well as victims of abuse.

Project LIVES!  
Project LIVES! is an annual humanitarian relief & awareness campaign. The campaign was first started in 2007 and sought to aid targeted communities relief items through community action. Relief aid has typically taken the form of cold wear, food items, hygiene items, and children's toys. Held yearly in Singapore, the Project LIVES! has also become a platform for inspiring action in the community, creating awareness for caring for communities.

Microentrepreneurship: Integrated Farming and Project SHOPHOUSE! 
Integrated Farm and The SHOPHOUSE! and Integrated Farm are social enterprises created to aid victims of domestic violence by providing jobs, work skills training and rehabilitation in a safe environment. The goal is to empower these womenfolk to one day attain financial independence and self-sufficiency.

RADION also started the Project SHOPHOUSE, one of its earliest initiatives, to provide low-cost internet access to needy students.

RADION started an integrated farm in 2009 to trial and showcase the feasibility of different farming technologies for farmers, helping them in areas of animal husbandry, agriculture, aquaculture and bio fuel development.

Community and Livelihood Development 
The organisation built on the success of the farm to start off the community development program - a holistic programme to address issues of poverty, domestic violence, substance abuse and lack of healthcare among rural communities.

DEKThai Children's Weekend Education 
A preventive children's weekend program, preventing underprivileged children from falling into vices of drugs and domestic violence. The program provides weekend tuition, livelihood skills training, healthcare education and nutrition to village children that come from poor backgrounds.

Village Outreach Programme (VO) 
An elderly care program that provides nursing care, nutrition and emotional support to the poorest and most at-risk villagers in the community.

Community Development Program (CDP) 
A two-pronged program with an advocacy arm to educate youth in an effort to break the vicious cycle of poverty, violence and drugs, and a social business arm that provides practical work-skill training and safe shelter for victims of domestic violence.

Organizational Philosophy 
The organisation is founded on Christian values. According to the organization's founders, RADION's name originates from the combination of two words, "RADIATING" and "MISSION". It strongly believes in reaching oppressed and needy groups through practical actions and to be a catalyst for change within these communities.

Long-Term Developmental Model 
RADION targets communities that are marginalised due to political, geographical or social constraints. The organisation promotes aid and community development through a four-prong approach, administering programs to children, young adults and the elderly. The organization is currently the only non-governmental organization serving the Hmong hill-tribe village of Khek Noi — the largest Hmong community in Thailand.

Short-Term Humanitarian Relief
RADION provides direct assistance to all rural villages within a 120 km radius of its integrated centre in Phetchabun, Thailand in the event of natural calamities or disasters that occur in the area.

Humanitarian Relief/Recovery projects are short term projects targeted at channeling timely life-saving support to underserved communities in the event of natural disasters or calamities.

These adhoc projects provide affected villagers with food, shelter, medical care and crisis support.

Disaster Recovery projects aim to provide mid-term assistance to communities impacted by disasters through the provision of livelihood options and economic recovery.

Past Projects
2007–2009 : Pioneered outreaches spanning 600 km across Thailand, providing 8900 Hmong-Lao refugees in 3 different areas with humanitarian aid.

a.	Phetchabun Refugee Camp (8200 refugees)

b.	Nong Khai Detention Center (158 refugees)

c.	Refugee Settlement (450 refugees)

Each site had different pressing needs, and as a result, outreach operations varied in scale and intensity from basic MILK! Missions (children nutrition augmentation missions), FRUITS! Mission (family food augmentation mission) to first-aid training.

Jan 2009 : Disaster Relief & Medical Support

RADION International responded when the Thai government called for additional support during the sudden cold snap in 2009. RADION International provided medical assistance to 8 villages within a 120 km radius from RADION's field office in Phetchabun.

Nov 2013 - Jan 2014 : Disaster Relief For Super Typhoon Haiyan (Yolanda)

RADION was amongst the first to respond after Super Typhoon Haiyan hit the Philippines in Nov 2013. The disaster response team spearheaded missions into Capiz Province that had been devastated by the typhoon but neglected by other aid agencies. The relief effort is currently still ongoing with volunteer teams providing medical care, relief items and establishing development initiatives to assist and restore affected communities.

Impact and Accolades 
The STREETKIDS!  programme saw a 66% rehabilitation success rate for juvenile drug users on the programme.

RADION's community development initiatives and successful collaboration with local leaders brought juvenile substance use down from 25% to 11.9%. The effort was recognized by the Social Development Office, Royal Thai Embassy and RADION was awarded Outstanding Brands by BrandAlliance.

Media References

Partners & Supporters
RADION International accepts donations from a number of countries, including Singapore, Thailand, Australia, United States of America and United Kingdom.

RADION receives support from individuals and corporate partners, including:

Crocs, which donated several hundred pairs of footwear.
Singapore Technologies (Info-communications), which helped to set up satellite collection for relief items.
Lee Foundation, supported project cost for education projects
Welch Allyn, which donated medical equipment and essentials towards the projects
Starhub, which donated school bags and stationary
The Pan Pacific Singapore, which contributed retail space to serve as a collection centre for a RADION donation drive in February 2009.
Syngenta, which supported agricultural development projects
The Salvation Army Singapore, which contributed relief items.
 FS Freight Systems Pte. Ltd.
Crabtree & Evelyn, which donated essential toiletries.
 Woleco, contributed hygiene items.

Supporters
 Afiko Delivery, which is contributing S$1 out of every S$50 of revenue towards RADION.
 colinsphotograffi, which contributes 10% of profits & photography services towards RADION's marketing and communications materials.
 NUS Medical Society, ongoing collaboration to provide medical care in impoverished communities.
INTASE, donates a percentage of profits towards education and development projects

Notes & References

External links
RADION International website
RADION International Thailand website

Charities based in Thailand
Refugee aid organizations
Religious organizations based in Thailand
Organizations established in 2007